Prodoxus praedictus is a moth of the family Prodoxidae. It is found in the United States in the southern part of the Mojave Desert and bordering areas of the Colorado Desert, as well as in the central portion of the Joshua Tree National Park in California.

The wingspan is 10-10.9 mm for males and 11.4-12.8 mm for females. The forewings are pale tan and the hindwings are light brownish to darker brownish gray. Adults are on wing from late March to early April.

The larvae feed on Yucca schidigera. They feed in a gallery inside the fruit wall of developing fruits of their host plant.

Etymology
The species epithet, praedictus meaning "predicted", reflects that a fruit-feeding bogus yucca moth had been predicted, but never identified, to exist on Yucca schidigera, despite decades of attention by entomologists.

References

Moths described in 2009
Prodoxidae